A jewelry model is a master design that is copied to make many similar pieces of jewelry.  The model may either be a piece of actual finished jewelry or a low-cost blank fashioned from base metal.  In either case, the model is used to create the casting mold from which all subsequent pieces are made.
Prefabricated models are available from a number of sources to supply the hobby and high-volume jewelry manufacture trade.

References 
 Cappellieri, Alba (2010). Twentieth-century Jewelry: From Art Nouveau to Contemporary Design in Europe and the United States. .

Jewellery making